Elia Goode Byington (Goode; March 24, 1856/58 – February 3, 1936) was an American journalist. With her husband, she was joint proprietor, editor, and manager of the Columbus Evening Ledger. Byington served as President of the Georgia Women's Press club. She died in 1936.

Early life and education
Elia Virginia Warren Goode was born in Thomaston, Georgia, March 24, 1856/58. She came from a distinguished Georgia family, being the daughter of Col. Charles T. Goode, of Americus, and granddaughter of Gen. Eli Warren, of Perry.

Byington received her education in the Furlow Female College, in Americus and in the Georgia Female College in Madison.

Career
Her father died when she was sixteen, leaving a large family and a limited income. Because of her knowledge of music, she became a teacher. After two years, in 1877, she married Edward Telfair Byington. Becoming interested in her husband's journalistic labors, she began to assist him with her writing. With her husband, she was joint proprietor, editor and manager of the Columbus Evening Ledger, a successful southern daily. She was interested in the intellectual and industrial progress of woman, and as such, with the exception of the carrier boys and four men for outdoor work, all of the employees of the Evening Ledger office were women. Byington also organized a Worker's Club as an aid to the many young girls who were burdened with southern conservatism. 

Byington was president of the Woman's Press Club of Georgia, as well as secretary and treasurer of the Art Club, the leading social and literary organization of Columbus. She was also a member of the Daughters of the American Revolution, serving as Recording Secretary of the Oglethorpe Chapter of Columbus.

Personal life
Byington lived in Georgia all her life. She died February 3, 1936, and is buried at Rose Hill Cemetery in Macon, Georgia.

Notes

References

Attribution

Bibliography

External links
 
 

1858 births
1936 deaths
19th-century American women writers
19th-century American newspaper publishers (people)
19th-century American newspaper editors
People from Thomaston, Georgia
Daughters of the American Revolution people
American women non-fiction writers
Women newspaper editors
Wikipedia articles incorporating text from A Woman of the Century